Jacobus Casperus Johannes 'Rampie' Stander  (25 December 1944  – 28 August 1980) was a South African rugby union player.

Playing career
Born in Cape Town, Stander grew up in Vanderbijlpark and after he finished school, enrolled at Stellenbosch University for a law degree. He played rugby for the University from 1966 to 1971 and during this time made his senior provincial debut for Western Province. Stander moved to Bloemfontein in 1972 and continued his playing career with the Free State.

Stander was selected on the replacement bench for the Springboks during the test series against the 1974 touring British Lions team. He did not get an opportunity during the first three tests and made his test debut during the fourth test against the Lions when he replaced Niek Bezuidenhout after seventeen minutes in the second half. Stander toured with the Springboks to France at the end of 1974, but Bezuidenhout regained his place for the test series during the tour. In 1976 Stander was selected for all four test matches against the touring All Blacks. Stander played five tests and three tour matches for South Africa and scored one try during a tour match.

Test history

See also
List of South Africa national rugby union players – Springbok no.  479

References

1944 births
1980 deaths
South African rugby union players
South Africa international rugby union players
Western Province (rugby union) players
Free State Cheetahs players
Rugby union players from Cape Town
Rugby union props